The discography of Rosanne Cash, an American singer-songwriter, consists of 14 studio albums, six compilation albums, and 39 singles. The daughter of Johnny Cash, Rosanne Cash recorded her self-titled debut album in 1978 under the German label Ariola. After signing with Columbia Records in 1979, Cash's second studio album Right or Wrong was released. Its lead single "No Memories Hangin' Around" (a duet with Bobby Bare) reached the Top 20 on the Billboard Hot Country Songs chart. Cash's third studio release, Seven Year Ache (1981), gained major success when the title track peaked at number one on the Billboard Country chart. It was then followed by "My Baby Thinks He's a Train" and "Blue Moon with a Heartache," which also reached the top spot. The album's follow-up effort, Somewhere in the Stars (1982) produced three Top 20 hits on the Billboard chart. 

After a three-year hiatus, Cash issued Rhythm & Romance in 1985. It topped the Billboard Top Country Albums list and spawned four Top 10 singles. Among them was the number one song, "I Don't Know Why You Don't Want Me," which won the Grammy Award for Best Female Country Vocal Performance in 1986. Her sixth album, King's Record Shop was released in 1987. The album peaked at number six on the country albums chart and certified gold in the United States. The four singles released from King's Record Shop all reached number one on the Billboard Country chart between 1987 and 1988, including a cover of Johnny Cash's "Tennessee Flat-Top Box."

In 1990, Cash released her seventh studio recording, Interiors, which gained critical acclaim by music critics, but only produced one Top 40 single, "What We Really Want." Her next release, The Wheel (1993) was Cash's final release for Columbia and did not spawn any major hits. In 1996, 10 Song Demo, an eleven-track album of demo recordings, was released on Capitol Records. Cash returned to recording 2003 with her eleventh studio release, Rules of Travel, which was produced by her husband, John Leventhal on Capitol. It was followed by 2006's Black Cadillac, which reflected upon the death of her father, her mother, and stepmother. In October 2009, she issued her thirteenth studio release, The List, which was based on a personal list given to her by her father that he considered to be the "one hundred essential country songs." Her fourteenth studio album, The River & the Thread was released in January 2014, which debuted at number two on the country albums chart and number 11 on the Billboard 200. It was followed in 2018 by She Remembers Everything.

Albums

Studio albums

Compilation albums

Singles

As lead artist

As a featured artist

Videography

Video albums

Music videos

Album appearances

Notes

References

External links 
 Rosanne Cash at Discogs

Country music discographies
Discographies of American artists